Pierre Wouters (25 January 1931 – 28 December 1999) was a Belgian boxer. He competed in the men's welterweight event at the 1952 Summer Olympics.

References

1931 births
1999 deaths
Belgian male boxers
Olympic boxers of Belgium
Boxers at the 1952 Summer Olympics
Sportspeople from Brussels
Welterweight boxers